AOT may refer to:

Science and technology
 Abstract object theory
 Aerosol OT, a common chemical reagent; see Dioctyl sodium sulfosuccinate
 Ahead-of-time compilation, an implementation approach for programming languages
 Assisted outpatient treatment, an implementation of mental-health law in the U.S.

Transport
 Aeronautical operations technician
 Airports of Thailand, an airport operator
 Aosta Airport (IATA code), Italy
 Autorité organisatrice de transports, a French legal structure for the provision of public transport
 Oil transporter (US Navy hull classification symbol: AOT)

Media
 Army of Two, a video game
 Attack on Titan, a Japanese manga series by Hajime Isayama

Other uses 
Academy of Technology, an engineering college in West Bengal, India
 A.O. Trikala, a football club in Trikala, Greece